Rainbow is the debut album by Japanese singer Miho Fukuhara.  It peaked at No. 2 on the Oricon charts and sold 200,000 copies to date.

Track listing

Charts

Certifications from Rainbow
From Rainbow
"Yasashii Aka"
Japan Downloads certification: Platinum (100,000)
"Love: Winter Song"
Japan Downloads certification: Gold (100,000)

2009 albums